Edith Maud Hull (16 August 1880 – 11 February 1947) was a British writer of romance novels, typically credited as E. M. Hull. She is best known for The Sheik, which became an international best seller in 1921. The Sheik is credited with beginning a revival of the "desert romance" genre of romantic fiction. Hull followed The Sheik with several other novels with desert settings, such as The Shadow of the East, The Desert Healer, and The Sons of the Sheik.

Personal life
Born Edith Maud Henderson on 16 August 1880 in the Borough of Hampstead, London, England, she was the daughter of James Henderson, a Liverpool shipowner originally from New York City, and Katie Thorne, of New Brunswick, Canada. As a child she travelled widely with her parents, even visiting Algeria—- the setting of her novels. 

In 1899, she married Percy Winstanley Hull (b. 1869), a civil engineer and later a prize-winning pig farmer. The couple relocated to the Hull family estate in Derbyshire during the early 1900s. They had a daughter, Cecil Winstanley Hull.

Hull was somewhat reclusive and did not seek publicity. She died at age 66, on 11 February 1947 in Hazelwood, in the parish of Duffield, Derbyshire.

Writing career
Hull wrote fiction while her husband was away serving in World War I. The Sheik, her first effort, was published in England in 1919 and to her surprise quickly became an international bestseller, scoring among Publishers Weekly's ten best sellers in America for both of the years 1921 and 1922. Hull's volume quickly sold more than 1.2 million copies worldwide. Sales further increased when Paramount released a movie version of The Sheik during 1921, which greatly increased the fame of the main actor, Rudolph Valentino. By 1923, the novel had more than a hundred editions, and sales had surpassed all other best-sellers combined. Hull's novel was not the first desert romance—- the genre had been initiated mainly by writers like Robert Smythe Hichens and Kathlyn Rhodes—- but it was the most popular and influential on later romance writers.

Hull continued to write into the 1930s, and her 1925 novel The Sons of the Sheik was also a tremendous success, as was the movie version Son of the Sheik, which again featured Valentino in what was to be his last movie.

During her later life, Hull expressed regret that she had sold the movie rights for her novels for too little money.

During the 1940s, Canadian science fiction writer Edna Mayne Hull initially published her work as "E.M. Hull", before switching to the credited name E. Mayne Hull to avoid confusion.  The two writers are not related.

Bibliography

The Sheik saga
 The Sheik, 1919
 The Sons of the Sheik, 1925

Single novels
 The Shadow of the East, 1921
 The Desert Healer, 1923
 The Lion-Tamer, 1928
 The Captive of the Sahara, 1931
 The Forest of Terrible Things, 1939 (title in US: Jungle Captive)

Travel memoir
 Camping in the Sahara, 1926 (with photographs by Hull's daughter Cecil)

See also

 Robert S. Hichens
 Elinor Glyn

References and sources

External links 
  E. M. Hull Remembered
 
 
  
 
  The Sheik and The Shadow of the East Part of the PublicBookshelf online romance novel collection
 The Women's Library Archives, which contains "Books and papers relating to EM Hull "

1880 births
1947 deaths
19th-century British people
19th-century British women
20th-century British novelists
20th-century British women writers
Modernism
People from Duffield
People from Hampstead
Writers from London
British people of American descent
British people of Canadian descent
British romantic fiction writers
British women novelists
Women romantic fiction writers